The Aussie salute, otherwise known as the Barcoo salute (named after the region around Barcoo River, Queensland), is the gesture commonly deployed all across Australia to deter bush flies (Musca vetustissima) from the human face.

The movement responds to the fly found in Australia, the bush fly. The Musca vetustissima is attracted to such fluids as saliva, tears and sweat, resulting in them often hovering around human faces. With things such as cork hats popularized to help keep off the fly, the gesture can be spotted across the country, not just in regional areas. Such a gesture is so common in the nation now known as Australia, it can commonly seen in media. Such illustrations of the gesture colloquially referred to as the ‘Aussie salute’ include but is not limited to YouTube video, national television and online publications.

Process 
As illustrated in a YouTube video posted by John Walsh and then reposted by The University of Adelaide blog, ‘Life in Adelaide News’, the Aussie Salute is a quick movement using the arm and movement from the hand to wrist. Bent at the point of the elbow and straight from the wrist to the hand, the process of an Aussie Salute involves the arm being raised closer to the participant's face. Movement is then seen as the hand moves, fingers running parallel to the jaw, rotating the hand on the wrist joint across the face. The gesture is often repeated.

The movement is often repeated due to the agility of the bush fly. With their two sets of wings, they are able to react to the hand gesture quickly and return to their position around the said person's face. The fly is also able to use their compound eyes to anticipate the incoming hand, able to sense through the sudden presence of shade around them.

Origins 
The large population of the Australian bush fly and its taste for human moisture is what has seen the need for such a movement as the Aussie salute.

Australia has a large amount of bush flies (A.Milewski, 2016, p. 22), an animal that grow within other animals' faeces. Going by the colloquial name bush fly, the animal (Musca vetustissima) found in Australia is much more keen to place itself on the human face compared to its international counterparts. For example, the eye fly (Musca sorbens) found in Africa and Asia, live primary around agricultural animals.

Although cattle are now the main contemporary breading ground the bush fly, it was in fact the emu was able to create the best breading ground for the bush fly (Musca vetustissima) prior English colonization of the land mass. While the faeces of both the human and the dog  would have been adequate vessels for the bush fly, several factors point to the fact they weren't the capable to be the primary breeding ground to the fly. The first of which is that fact that human population wasn't dense enough and the precolonial Australian dog (the dingo), hadn't been in the country long enough to establish themselves[10], having only been there for a few thousands years.

The large native Australian bird, the emu, has large wet faeces allowing for the 3–4 days  incubation needed for fly larvae. The emu faeces is also highly suited for the fly as nutrient rich to allow for the flies rapid growth. The emu faeces is also not too highly attractive for native Australian dung beetles, getting rid of a potential competitor for space. Emu faeces wasn't attractive to such species as the dung beetle due to its texture being hard to work with as a result of the emu's fast digesting rate. This fast digestion rate is allowed through the emu's lack of a large intestine or a large gizzard. The emu's faeces has a non-solid and rope like texture. This texture is due to the emu's diet including fruits, invertebrates, flowers and shoots. With a highly varied diet and lack of competition for space, emu faeces are great breeding ground for the Musca vetustissima.

The other factor that allowed for the native emu to facilitate the growth the bush fly (Musca vetustissima) larvae is their estimated pre-colonial population. Their previous population, before Australia was an English colony, is likely to of been high than the population of human.

The bush fly does not seek out blood like other flies (mosquitoes) and seek instead to suck up the moisture produced on a human's face; saliva, tears and sweat. Where the common housefly (Drosophila melanogaster) may have to vomit to digest their food, bush flies don't. The fly have been found to possibly carry bacteria such as E. coli and associated with the eye disease trachoma, caused by the bacterium Chlamydia trachomatis.

When the weather gets hotter, the bush fly migrates south, following large crowds of people as they flock outside for the warm weather. The prevalence of the bush fly in Australia has resulted for the need for such a gesture as the Aussie Salute.

Illustrations in Media 
The gesture can be spotted across the country and across popular media. Such illustrations include:

An online interview writer Tom Tebbutt held with Canadian tennis players at the Australian Open: https://www.youtube.com/watch?v=-ctEFJMNFBc

TEN Melbourne News story headlined, “The Great Aussie Salute: Victorians are not only suffering unusually hot weather but also an influx of flies”

ABC (Australian Broadcasting Corporation) online science story written by Genelle Weule with quotations from Dr Maggie Hardy of the University of Queensland. https://www.abc.net.au/news/science/2017-01-26/salute-the-great-australian-bush-fly/8211770

References

External links

Australian slang
Environment of Australia
Flies and humans
Hand gestures
Insects in culture
Insects of Australia